Hristo Popadiyn (born 4 January 1994) is a Bulgarian professional footballer who plays as a defender for Slavia Sofia.

Career

Levski Sofia 
Popadiyn bеgan his career with Levski Sofia. In the beginning of 2013 he was sent on loan to the Italian Serie A team Chievo Verona until the end of the season. He returned to Levski for the 2013/14 season making his official debut for the club in a cup match against Pirin Gotse Delchev won by Levski with 0:5. He was sent on loan to Vitosha Bistritsa in the beginning of 2014 until the end of the season.

Botev and Lokomotiv 
After his loan to Vitosha ended he left Levski and moved to Botev Vratsa. He made his debut for the team in a match against Dobrudzha on 2 August 2014. For the cup the team was drawn against the Bulgarian champions Ludogorets Razgrad and Popadiyn played in the match on 24 September 2014.

On 12 January 2015 Popadiyn moved to another team in the B Group, Lokomotiv 2012 Mezdra.

Ludogorets Razgrad 
After receiving offers from teams from A Group he chose to move to the newly created second team of Ludogorets Razgrad. He made his debut for Ludogorets II on 25 July 2015 in a match against Dunav Ruse.

On 23 September 2015 he made his debut for the Ludogorets first team in the Bulgarian Cup in a 5–0 win over Lokomotiv 1929 Mezdra.

On 22 May 2016 he made his complete debut in A Group for Ludogorets in a match against Beroe Stara Zagora. On 7 September 2016 he became the third player after Ventsislav Kerchev and Yanaki Smirnov who joined Lokomotiv Gorna Aryahovitsa on loan until the end of the 2016-17 season, but 2 days later returned in Ludogorets.

On 9 November 2016, Popadiyn was released by Ludogorets.

Vitosha Bistritsa
In February 2017, following a few months without a club, Popadiyn joined Vitosha Bistritsa.

Dunav Ruse
On 6 June 2017 he signed a contract with Dunav Ruse.

Slavia Sofia 
In January 2022, Popadiyn joined Slavia Sofia for the second time.

Career statistics

Club

References

External links

Living people
1994 births
Bulgarian footballers
Bulgaria under-21 international footballers
Bulgaria youth international footballers
Association football defenders
FC Vitosha Bistritsa players
FC Botev Vratsa players
PFC Ludogorets Razgrad II players
PFC Ludogorets Razgrad players
FC Dunav Ruse players
PFC Slavia Sofia players
FC Tsarsko Selo Sofia players
First Professional Football League (Bulgaria) players